The Government of Nova Scotia refers to the provincial government of the Canadian province of Nova Scotia. Nova Scotia is one of Canada's four Atlantic Provinces, and the second-smallest province by area. The capital of the province, Halifax, is Nova Scotia's largest city and its political capital. Halifax is where the Province House, Canada's oldest legislative building, is located.

The Government of Nova Scotia consists of three branches: legislative, executive and judicial. Its powers and structure are set out in the Constitution Act, 1867. In modern Canadian use, the term "government" refers broadly to the cabinet of the day (formally the Executive Council of Nova Scotia), elected from the Nova Scotia House of Assembly and the non-political staff within each provincial department or agency – that is, the civil service.

The Province of Nova Scotia is governed by a unicameral legislature, the Nova Scotia House of Assembly, which operates in the Westminster system of government. In total, 55 representatives are elected to serve the interests of the province. The political party that wins the largest number of seats in the legislature normally forms the government, and the party's leader becomes premier of the province (the head of the government). The current government of the province is led by the Progressive Conservative Association of Nova Scotia, headed by Premier Tim Houston who was sworn into office in August 2021.

History 
The history of Canadian parliamentary institutions begins in Nova Scotia. In 1758, it was granted an elected assembly, becoming the first Canadian colony to enjoy a representative political institution. The representatives of Nova Scotia's House of Assembly were elected by a limited number of individuals who were required to own property and swear on certain oaths. This changed in 1836 when political reformer Joseph Howe started the movement for Responsible Government. Responsible Government is described as a government that is dependent on the support of an elected assembly instead of a monarch. Under the guidance of Joseph Howe, who led the Reformers (Liberals), the first genuine political party appeared in the election of 1836.

Premier of Nova Scotia 
The Premier, or First Minister, of Nova Scotia is the head of the Executive Council of Nova Scotia. Being the head of government in Nova Scotia, the premier exercises a substantial amount of power.  Hon. James B. Uniacke was the first Premier of Nova Scotia and led the government from 1848 to 1854.

The current Premier, Tim Houston, was sworn in as premier on August 31, 2021. He is the 30th Premier of the Province of Nova Scotia since Confederation.

Lieutenant Governor of Nova Scotia 

The functions of the Sovereign, Charles III, King of Canada, and known in Nova Scotia as the King in Right of Nova Scotia, are exercised by the Lieutenant Governor of Nova Scotia. The Lieutenant Governor is appointed by the Governor General of Canada on the recommendation of the Prime Minister of Canada, in consultation with the Premier of Nova Scotia. In the case of unconstitutional actions, the Lieutenant Governor has the power to dismiss a government by refusing a decision of the Executive Council. This power is rarely used as it would disrupt the affairs of the elected government.

The Executive Branch 
The Executive branch is referred to as the government. The Executive Council, also called the Cabinet, makes the final decision for the Government of Nova Scotia. It is responsible for the operations and management of government as well as for making key policy decisions. The Executive Council is made up of Ministers, also called MLAs (Members in the Legislative Assembly). They are chosen by the Premier and appointed by the Lieutenant Governor.

Finance
The Nova Scotia government ended 2010–2011 with a surplus of $569 million and reduced its debt to $12.8 billion, down $217.8 million. The Nova Scotia government projects total revenues for 2018–2019 to be $10.810 billion. Expenses for fiscal year 2018-2019 are budgeted at $10.781 billion. The government budget for 2018–2019 projects a surplus of $29.4 million

Ministries

Departments
 Department of Advanced Education
 Department of Agriculture
 Department of Communities, Culture, Tourism, and Heritage 
 Acadian Affairs and Francophonie
 African Nova Scotian Affairs 
 Gaelic Affairs 
 Department of Community Services 
 Department of Economic Development
 Department of Education and Early Childhood Development
 Department of Environment and Climate Change
 Department of Finance and Treasury Board 
 Department of Fisheries and Aquaculture
 Department of Health and Wellness
 Department of Intergovernmental Affairs
 Department of Justice
 Department of Labour, Skills and Immigration
 Department of Municipal Affairs and Housing 
 Department of Natural Resources and Renewables
 Department of Public Works
 Department of Seniors and Long-term Care
 Department of Service Nova Scotia and Internal Services

Offices and agencies
 Communications Nova Scotia
 Executive Council Office 
 Emergency Management Office
 Office of Addictions and Mental Health
 Office of Equity and Anti-Racism Initiatives
 Office of the Fire Marshal
 Office of L'nu Affairs
 Office of Regulatory Affairs and Service Effectiveness
 Public Service Commission

Outsourcing
In 2012 Nova Scotia signed a 10-year contract starting at $Cdn 8.4 million per year, with multinational information technology firm, IBM Canada to outsource the government's SAP information management system, which includes "payroll, procurement, human resources and other information from government departments, district health authorities, school boards, housing authorities and some municipal bodies.
One hundred public sector jobs will be privatized in the first stage. Workers whose jobs were privatized would "earn 30 per cent less, with many fewer benefits" than in the public sector. The deal is worth approximately $100 million. There is a concern that IT outsourcing will spread throughout the government. Kevin Quigley, the director of Dalhousie University's School of Public Administration, argued that while outsourcing may cut costs but it also leads to a dependency on an external source and a loss of control over software, capacity-building and human resource development.
IBM Canada will make Halifax a global delivery centre, with a potential for 500 employees by 2021.

See also 
Politics of Nova Scotia
2017 Nova Scotia general election
Broadband for Rural Nova Scotia initiative

References

External links
 Official Site

 
Business process outsourcing
Outsourcing in Canada